Dark Planet: Battle for Natrolis is a real-time strategy video game developed by Creative Edge Software and published by Ubi Soft for Microsoft Windows in 2002.

Reception

The game received "mixed" reviews according to the review aggregation website Metacritic.

References

External links
 

MoDDB site

2002 video games
Creative Edge Software games
Real-time strategy video games
Ubisoft games
Video games developed in the United Kingdom
Windows games
Windows-only games